This is a list of South Carolina Gamecocks football players in the NFL Draft.

Key

Selections

References

South Carolina

South Carolina Gamecocks NFL Draft